The New Goodies LP was the second LP record released by The Goodies. All songs were written by Bill Oddie except "Wild Thing" which was written by Chip Taylor with adaptation by Bill Oddie. "Baby Samba", "Rock With A Policeman" and "Nappy Love" had previously been written by Oddie for use in I'm Sorry, I'll Read That Again. It was recorded in June and July 1975 at Olympic Studios (although the album cover says it was "recorded almost live at the Cricklewood Rainbow") and produced by Miki Antony. As with their first album, the music was performed mainly by session musicians. Arrangements were by Dave MacRae, with the exception of "Please Let Us Play", "Cricklewood", "Good Ole Country Music", "Baby Samba" and "Nappy Love" which were arranged by Tom Parker.

It was their most successful album, spending 11 weeks in the UK Albums Chart and peaking at #25.

"Goodies Theme", "Funky Gibbon" and "Nappy Love" had been released as singles prior to the album. "Custard Pie" was released as a single in 1976.

"Wild Thing" was used in "The Goodies Rule – O.K.?", broadcast a month after the album was released. Some of the songs on the album were featured in "The Goodies – Almost Live" the following year.

Track listing

Personnel
 Tim Brooke-Taylor – vocals
 Graeme Garden – vocals, banjo
 Bill Oddie – vocals, percussion
 Jackie Sullivan – backing vocals
 Joy Yates – backing vocals
 Sue Lynch – backing vocals
 Alan Parker – guitar
 Bernie Holland – guitar
 Joe Moretti – guitar
 Gordon Huntley – pedal steel guitar
 Brian Odges – bass guitar
 Tony Campo – bass guitar
 Dave MacRae – keyboard
 Tom Parker – keyboard
 Bob Bertles – saxophone
 Chris Hughes – saxophone
 Tony Fisher – trumpet
 Derek Watkins – trumpet
 Geoff Wright – trombone
 Tony Carr – percussion, drums
 Clem Cattini – drums
 Barry Morgan – drums
 Billy Rantim – drums

See also
 The Goodies discography

References

The Goodies albums
1975 albums